The MLW Azteca/The Crash Show, also known as the MLW Azteca • The Crash Super Card, was a professional wrestling supercard event co-produced by the U.S-based Major League Wrestling (MLW) and Mexico-based The Crash Lucha Libre (The Crash), which was held in The Crash's home arena, Auditorio Fausto Gutierrez Moreno in Tijuana, Baja California, Mexico on December 3, 2021. It was the second event to be co-produced by the two promotions following The Crash/Major League Wrestling show in 2019.

The event was taped for the mini-series, MLW Azteca, which premiered on January 6, 2022.

Production

Background
In October 2020, MLW would began incorporating story elements from the defunct Lucha Libre promotion and former television drama, Lucha Underground. Talent formerly associated with Lucha Underground were brought into MLW as part of the "Azteca Underground" stable.

On November 8, 2021, MLW announced that it would be holding its second co-promoted event with The Crash at the Auditorio Fausto Gutierrez Moreno in Tijuana, Baja California, Mexico on December 3.

Storylines
The supercard featured professional wrestling matches scripted by MLW and The Crash featuring wrestlers involved in scripted feuds. The wrestlers portrayed either heels (referred to as rudos in Mexico, those that play the part of the "bad guys") or faces (técnicos in Mexico, the "good guy" characters) as they performed.

Results

References

2021 in Mexico
2021 in professional wrestling
Major League Wrestling shows
December 2021 events in Mexico
Professional wrestling in Mexico
Professional wrestling joint events
The Crash Lucha Libre shows